A Manager was any of a set of specialized components of the classic Mac OS operating system, including those that comprised the Macintosh Toolbox. Each of these Managers was responsible for handling system calls from applications running on the Macintosh, and could be built into the ROM or be loaded into RAM by the system.

Many of these Managers and their functions have been ported to or re-implemented in the Carbon application frameworks. Some of the Managers included in various versions of the Mac OS include:

 Code Fragment Manager (CFM)
 Component Manager
 Data Access Manager
 Edition Manager; used by the ‘Publish and Subscribe’ feature
 File Manager
 Mixed-Mode Manager
 Resource Manager
 Scrap Manager
 Sound Manager
 Speech Manager
 Window Manager

References

Macintosh operating systems development